Jan Staszel (born 15 September 1950 in Dzianisz) was a Polish cross-country skier who competed during the 1970s. He won a bronze medal in the 30 km at the 1974 FIS Nordic World Ski Championships in Falun. He also competed at the 1972 Winter Olympics and the 1976 Winter Olympics.

References

External links

1950 births
Living people
Polish male cross-country skiers
FIS Nordic World Ski Championships medalists in cross-country skiing
People from Tatra County
Sportspeople from Lesser Poland Voivodeship
Olympic cross-country skiers of Poland
Cross-country skiers at the 1972 Winter Olympics
Cross-country skiers at the 1976 Winter Olympics